The 2014 Città di Como Challenger was a professional tennis tournament played on clay courts. It was the ninth edition of the tournament which was part of the 2014 ATP Challenger Tour. It took place in Como, Italy, between 25 and 31 August 2014.

Singles main-draw entrants

Seeds

 1 Rankings are as of August 18, 2014.

Other entrants
The following players received wildcards into the singles main draw:
  Salvatore Caruso
  Matteo Donati
  Alessandro Giannessi
  Pietro Licciardi

The following players received entry as an alternate into the singles main draw:
  Mirza Bašić
  Pierre-Hugues Herbert

The following players received entry from the qualifying draw:
  Boris Pašanski 
  Patrik Rosenholm 
  Viktor Troicki 
  Jürgen Zopp

Champions

Singles

  Viktor Troicki def.  Louk Sorensen 6–3, 6–2

Doubles

 Guido Andreozzi /  Facundo Argüello def.  Steven Diez /  Enrique López Pérez 6–2, 6–2

External links
Official Website

Citta di Como Challenger
Città di Como Challenger
Città di Como Challenger
Città di Como Challenger